Mahamadpur is a Village Development Committee in Bardiya District in Lumbini Province of south-western Nepal. At the time of the 1991 Nepal census it had a population of 8,191 and had 1152 houses in the town.

References

Populated places in Bardiya District